Champagne is a music album of 2002, made by the Venezuelan singer José Luis Rodríguez with the seal BMG U.S. Latin.  This album presents new versions of chart hits from the 1970s and 1980s.

Track listing
"Solo Puedo Mirar Atras" 
"Y Volvere" 
"A Ti" 
"Por Que Ahora" 
"Con" 
"Soy La Mitad De Lo Que Soy Sin Ti" 
"Butterfly" 
"Venecia Sin Ti" 
"Por Que Te Vas" 
"Champagne"

2002 albums
José Luis Rodríguez (singer) albums